César Goyeneche (born 26 August 1974) is a Colombian former professional racing cyclist. He won the Colombian National Road Race Championships in 1999.

References

External links
 

1974 births
Living people
Colombian male cyclists
Sportspeople from Bogotá